Sandile is a South African name that may refer to

Sandile Ginindza, Swaziland football player
Sandile Hlatjwako (born 1988), Swaziland football player
Sandile Ndlovu (born 1980), South African football striker
Sandile Ngcobo (born 1953), justice in the Constitutional Court of South Africa
Sandile Ngcobo (rugby union) (born 1989), South African rugby union player
Sandile Sibande (born 1987), South African football midfielder

See also
Sandile (disambiguation)

Given names of African origin